Henry John Parr (7 January 1838 – 24 April 1863) was an English first-class cricketer active 18565–58 who played for Nottinghamshire. He was born and died in Radcliffe-on-Trent.

References

1838 births
1863 deaths
English cricketers
Nottinghamshire cricketers